George William Coventry, 6th Earl of Coventry (26 April 1722 – 3 September 1809), styled Viscount Deerhurst from 1744 to 1751, was a British peer and Tory politician.

Early life
Coventry was the second but eldest surviving son of William Coventry, 5th Earl of Coventry, and his wife Elizabeth (née Allen), and was educated at Winchester and University College, Oxford.

Career

He was elected to the House of Commons for Bridport in 1744 (succeeding his elder brother Viscount Deerhurst), a seat he held until 1747, and then represented Worcestershire from 1747 to 1751. The latter year he succeeded his father in the earldom and entered the House of Lords. He also served as Lord Lieutenant of Worcestershire from 1751 to 1808 and was a Lord of the Bedchamber to George II from 1752 to 1760 and to George III from 1760 to 1770.

He inherited Croome Court, near Pershore, Worcestershire from his father and commissioned Capability Brown to redesign both the house and surrounding parkland.

Private life
Lord Coventry married firstly Maria, daughter of Colonel John Gunning, in 1752. She died in 1760, having produced a son and 2 daughter:
Lady Anne Margaret Coventry; married firstly Hon. Edward Foley, son of Thomas Foley, 1st Baron Foley (1716–1777).  Married secondly Capt. Samuel Wright.
Lady Mary Alicia Coventry; married Sir Andrew Baynton-Rolt 2nd Bt.  Had issue.
George Coventry, 7th Earl of Coventry; married firstly Lady Catherine Henley, daughter of Robert Henley, 1st Earl of Northington.  Married secondly Peggy Pitches, daughter of Sir Abraham Pitches.  Had issue from his second marriage.

He married secondly the Hon. Barbara, daughter of John St John, 11th Baron St John of Bletso, in 1764, with whom he had a further 2 sons and a daughter.  Lady Coventry died in 1804.

Lord Coventry survived his second wife by five years and died in September 1809, aged 87. He was succeeded in his titles by his son from his first marriage, George Coventry, 7th Earl of Coventry. His youngest son was Thomas William Coventry.

Gallery

See also
Broadway Tower, a folly built for Lady Coventry in 1798-99.
Croome Court

References
Kidd, Charles, Williamson, David (editors). Debrett's Peerage and Baronetage (1990 edition). New York: St Martin's Press, 1990.

External links

1722 births
1809 deaths
Alumni of University College, Oxford
Lord-Lieutenants of Worcestershire
Deerhurst, George Coventry, Viscount
People educated at Winchester College
British MPs 1741–1747
British MPs 1747–1754
Earls of Coventry